HMS Tay (K232) was a  of the Royal Navy. Tay was built to the RN's specifications as a Group I River-class frigate. She was adopted by the civil community of Bridge of Allan in Stirlingshire, as part of the Warship Week war savings campaign in 1942.

Royal Navy service
On commissioning Tay was allocated for service as a convoy escort in the Western Approaches and the Atlantic.

In June 1943 she was allocated for service in the Eastern Fleet, operating in the Indian Ocean. At the end of the war she remained based at Singapore, until returning to the UK in 1947 where she was paid off and reduced to reserve. She was placed on the disposal list in 1956 and was towed to the breakers yard at Rosyth on 26 September 1956.

References

Publications

External links
 http://www.warsailors.com/convoys/index.html Comprehensive details of the Atlantic convoys and their fates.

1942 ships
River-class frigates of the Royal Navy